Etlah may refer to:

Etlah, Missouri, a community in the United States
USS Etlah (disambiguation), multiple warships